The 1958 NCAA University Division basketball tournament involved 24 schools playing in single-elimination play to determine the national champion of men's NCAA Division I college basketball in the United States. It began on March 11, and ended with the championship game on Saturday, March 22, in Louisville, Kentucky. A total of 28 games were played, including a third-place game in each region and a national third-place game.

Led by head coach Adolph Rupp, the Kentucky Wildcats won the national title with an 84–72 victory in the final game over Seattle, coached by John Castellani. The Chieftains were outscored by fifteen in the second half, and Baylor was named the tournament's Most Outstanding Player.

Locations

The city of Louisville became the sixth host site, and Freedom Hall the seventh host venue, of the Final Four. The two-year-old building was the off-campus home to the Louisville Cardinals until the opening of the KFC Yum! Center in 2010. The tournament saw two other new venues. The tournament came to Charlotte for the first time at the Charlotte Coliseum. The tournament would be played at the building a dozen more times. The tournament also came to the East Bay area for the first time, playing at the Men's Gym (soon to be renamed Harmon Gym) on the campus of the University of California. This would be the only time the tournament would be held on the Cal campus, as well as on the campus of Oklahoma State University, with future games in Oklahoma held in either Tulsa, Oklahoma City or Norman.

Teams

Bracket
* – Denotes overtime period

East region

Mideast region

Midwest region

West region

Final Four

National third-place game

Regional third-place games

See also
 1958 NCAA College Division basketball tournament
 1958 National Invitation Tournament
 1958 NAIA Division I men's basketball tournament

References

NCAA Division I men's basketball tournament
Ncaa
Basketball competitions in Louisville, Kentucky
College sports tournaments in Kentucky
NCAA University Division basketball tournament
NCAA University Division basketball tournament